Dashli Qaleh (also Romanized as Dāshlī Qal‘eh) is a village in Gholaman Rural District, Raz and Jargalan District, Bojnord County, North Khorasan Province, Iran. At the 2006 census, its population was 910, in 228 families.

References 

Populated places in Bojnord County